The Polygar Wars or Palaiyakkarar Wars were wars fought between the Polygars (Palaiyakkarars) of the former Tirunelveli Kingdom in Tamil Nadu, India and the British East India Company forces between March 1799 to May 1802 or July 1805. The British finally won after carrying out gruelling protracted jungle campaigns against the Polygar armies. Many people died on both sides and the victory over the Polygars brought large parts of the territories of Tamil Nadu under British control, enabling them to get a strong hold in Southern India.

First Polygar War
The Polygar Wars were a series of wars fought by a coalition of Palaiyakkarar's against the British between 1750 and 1805. The war between the British and Maveeran Alagumuthukone is often classified as the First Polygar war (1759). The war between the British and Kattabomman Nayak of Panchalankurichi Palayam in the then Tirunelveli region is the First Polygar war in history. In 1799, a brief meeting (over pending taxes) between Kattabomman and the British ended in a bloody encounter in which the British commander of the forces was slain by the former. A price was put on Kattabomman's head prompting many Polygars to an open rebellion.

After a series of battles in the Panchalankurichi fort with additional reinforcements from Tiruchirapalli, Kattabomman was defeated, but he escaped to the jungles in Pudukottai country. He was captured by the British with the help of Ettappan, Pudukottai Raja after his backroom agreement with the British. After a summary trial, Kattabomman was hanged in front of the public in order to intimidate them in Kayatharu.

Subramania Pillai, a close associate of Kattabomman, was also publicly hanged and his head was fixed on a pike at Panchalankurichi for public view. Soundra Pandian, another rebel leader, was brutally killed by having his head smashed against a village wall. Kattabomman's brother Oomaidurai was imprisoned in Palayamkottai Central Prison while the fort was razed to the ground and wealth looted by the troops.

Second Polygar War
Despite the suppression of the First Polygar War in 1799, a rebellion broke out again in 1800. The Second Polygar War was more stealthy and covert in nature. The rebellion broke out when a band of Palayakkarar armies bombed the British barracks in Coimbatore. In the war that followed, Oomaithurai allied himself with Maruthu Pandiyar and was part of a grand alliance against the company which included Kerala Varma Pazhassi Raja of Malabar.

The Palayakarrars had artillery and a weapon manufacturing unit in Salem and Dindigul jungles. They also received clandestine training from the French in the Karur region. Dheeran Chinnamalai Gounder headed the western Tamil Nadu popularly known as Kongu Nadu. The British columns were exposed throughout the operations to constant harassing attacks and had usually to cut their way through almost impenetrable jungles fired on from undercover on all sides. The Polygars resisted stubbornly and the storming of their hill-forts proved on several occasions sanguinary (involving or causing much bloodshed)  work.

The British finally won after a long expensive campaign that took more than a year. The Company forces led by Lt. Colonel Agnew laid siege to the Panchalankurichi fort and captured it in May 1801 after a prolonged siege and artillery bombardment. Oomaithurai escaped the fall of the fort and joined Maruthu brothers at their jungle fort at Kalayar Kovil. The Company forces pursued him there and eventually captured Kalayar Kovil in October 1801. Oomaithurai and the Maruthu brothers were hanged on 16 November 1801 at Tiruppathur (Sivagangai Dist.).

Results
The suppression of the Polygar rebellions of 1799 and 1800-1805 resulted in the liquidation of the influence of the chieftains. Under the terms of the Carnatic Treaty (31 July 1801), the British assumed direct control over Tamil Nadu. The Polygar system which had flourished for two and a half centuries came to a violent end and the company introduced a Zamindari settlement in its place.

Later day folklore
In subsequent years, legend and folklore developed around Alagu muthu kone, Dheeran Chinnamalai, Kattabomman and Maruthu Pandiyar.

See also
 Indian rebellion of 1857
 Veeran Sundaralingam
 Rani Velu Nachiar
 Tipu Sultan
 Hyder Ali
 Uyyalawada Narasimha Reddy

Notes

References

Further reading
https://www.livehistoryindia.com/story/people/the-polygar-heroes-of-tamil-nadu

 N. Rajendran, National Movement in Tamil Nadu, 1905-1914 - Agitational Politics and State Coercion, Madras Oxford University Press.
 M.P. Manivel, 2003 - Viduthalaipporil Virupachi Gopal Naickar (Tamil Language), New Century Book House, Chennai
 Prof. K.Rajayyan M.A., M.Litt, A.M. Ph.D., A History of Freedom Struggle in India
 Prof. K.Rajayyan M.A., M.Litt, A.M. Ph.D., South Indian Rebellion - The First War of Independence (1800–1801)
 

 
Tamil history
History of Kerala
Military history of the British East India Company
18th century in India
Conflicts in 1799
Conflicts in 1800
Conflicts in 1801
Conflicts in 1802
1799 in British India
1800 in British India
1801 in British India
1802 in British India